The Central District of Kohgiluyeh County is a district (bakhsh) in Kohgiluyeh County, Kohgiluyeh and Boyer-Ahmad Province, Iran. At the 2006 census, its population was 90,244, in 17,347 families.  The District has two cities: Dehdasht and Suq. The District has five rural districts (dehestan): Dehdasht-e Gharbi Rural District, Dehdasht-e Sharqi Rural District, Doshman Ziari Rural District, Rak Rural District, and Tayebi-ye Garmsiri-ye Jonubi Rural District.

References 

Districts of Kohgiluyeh and Boyer-Ahmad Province
Kohgiluyeh County